The 1961 Bucknell Bison football team was an American football team that represented Bucknell University during the 1961 NCAA College Division football season. Bucknell finished second in the University Division of the Middle Atlantic Conference.

In its third season under head coach Bob Odell, the team compiled a 6–3 record, and a 5–2 record against division opponents. Kirk Foulke was the team captain.

The team played its home games at Memorial Stadium on the university campus in Lewisburg, Pennsylvania.

Schedule

References

Bucknell
Bucknell Bison football seasons
Bucknell Bison football